Charles Gordon MacArthur (November 5, 1895 – April 21, 1956) was an American playwright, screenwriter, and 1935 winner of the Academy Award for Best Story.

Life and career

MacArthur was born in Scranton, Pennsylvania, the sixth of seven children of stern evangelist William Telfer MacArthur and Georgiana Welsted MacArthur. Early in life, MacArthur developed a passion for reading. Declining to follow his father into ministry, he moved to the Midwest and soon became a successful reporter in Chicago, working for the Chicago Tribune and Chicago Daily News. MacArthur joined the United States Army for World War I, and served in France as a private assigned to Battery F, 149th Field Artillery, a unit of the 42nd Division. He recounted his wartime experience in 1919's A Bug's-Eye View of the War. After the war, he wrote several short stories, two of which, "Hang It All" (1921) and "Rope" (1923), were published in H. L. Mencken's The Smart Set magazine. Eventually he settled in New York City, where he turned to playwriting.

MacArthur is best known for his plays in collaboration with Ben Hecht, Ladies and Gentlemen (filmed as Perfect Strangers), Twentieth Century and the frequently filmed The Front Page, which was based in part on MacArthur's experiences at the City News Bureau of Chicago. MacArthur also co-wrote, with Edward Sheldon, the play Lulu Belle, which was staged in 1926 by David Belasco.

MacArthur was friends with members of the Algonquin Round Table. He shared an apartment with Robert Benchley and had an affair with Dorothy Parker.

His second marriage was to the stage and screen actress Helen Hayes, from 1928 until his death. They lived in Nyack, New York. He was preceded in death by his daughter, Mary, who died of polio in 1949 at the age of 19. The shock of her death hastened MacArthur's own, according to those who knew him. Their adopted son, James MacArthur, was also an actor, best known for playing Danny Williams on the American television series Hawaii Five-O.

His brother, John D. MacArthur, was an insurance-company owner and executive, and founded the John D. and Catherine T. MacArthur Foundation, the benefactor of the MacArthur Fellowships.

Awards and nominations
Academy Award for Best Writing, Original Story - The Scoundrel (shared with Ben Hecht) (1936)
 Nominations:
Best Writing, Screenplay - Wuthering Heights (shared with Ben Hecht) in 1940
Best Writing, Original Story - Rasputin and the Empress in 1934

In 1983, MacArthur was posthumously inducted into the American Theater Hall of Fame.

Film portrayal
MacArthur was portrayed by Matthew Broderick in the 1994 film Mrs. Parker and the Vicious Circle.

Selected works

Plays
 Swan Song (1946), (with Ben Hecht)
 Ladies and Gentlemen (1939), (with Ben Hecht), made into  the 1950 film Perfect Strangers
 Spring Tonic, made into the 1935 movie of the same name
 Johnny on a Spot
 Jumbo, (with Ben Hecht), made into the 1935 musical play Jumbo and the 1962 film musical Billy Rose's Jumbo
 Twentieth Century (with Ben Hecht), made into the 1934 film Twentieth Century
 The Front Page (1928), with Ben Hecht, made into the 1931, 1945, and 1974 motion pictures of the same name, the 1940 film His Girl Friday, and the 1988 movie Switching Channels
 Lulu Belle (1926), (with Edward Sheldon)

Screenplays
 Wuthering Heights (1939)
 Gunga Din (1939)
 Angels with Dirty Faces (1938) (uncredited)
 King of Gamblers (1937), aka Czar of the Slot Machines (uncredited)
 Soak the Rich (1936)
 The Scoundrel (1935)
 Barbary Coast (1935)
 Once in a Blue Moon (1935)
 Crime Without Passion (1934) (also directed by him and Ben Hecht)
Topaze (1933)
 Freaks (1932) (uncredited)
 Rasputin and the Empress (1932)
 The Unholy Garden (1931)
 Quick Millions (1931) (uncredited)
 Hell Divers (1931)
 New Adventures of Get Rich Quick Wallingford (1931)
 The Sin of Madelon Claudet (1931)
 Paid (1930)
 Way for a Sailor (1930)
 King of Jazz (1930) (uncredited)
 Billy the Kid (1930)
 The Girl Said No (1930)

References

External links

 Charles MacArthur at JamesMacArthur.com
 
 
 
 

1895 births
1956 deaths
20th-century American dramatists and playwrights
American male screenwriters
Writers from Chicago
Writers from New York City
Writers from Scranton, Pennsylvania
Best Story Academy Award winners
People from Nyack, New York
American male dramatists and playwrights
20th-century American male writers
Screenwriters from New York (state)
Screenwriters from Illinois
Screenwriters from Pennsylvania
Baptists from New York (state)
Baptists from Pennsylvania
Chicago Tribune people
20th-century American journalists
American male journalists
20th-century American screenwriters
20th-century Baptists
Algonquin Round Table
United States Army personnel of World War I
United States Army soldiers